The House of Kostojčinoski family, or House of Kostojčinovci is a house in the village of Vevčani, Vevčani Municipality, Macedonia. The house belongs to the Kostojčinoski family and the building is registered as a Cultural Heritage of Macedonia.

History 

The house belongs to the famous Vevčani family of masons, Kostojčinovci, who worked as migrant workers, mainly in Wallachia.

Architecture 

The house of Kostojčinoski is a small house with a colonnade of pillars and bay windows that circle the front part of the house, the lower part is in stone, and the upper part is of bundwerk construction.

Gallery

See also
 Kostojčinoski fulling mill and gristmill - a cultural heritage site
 House of Duckinoski family - a cultural heritage site
 House of Korunoski family - a cultural heritage site
 House of Ḱitanoski family - a cultural heritage site
 House of Pešinoski family - a cultural heritage site
 House of Pluškoski family - a cultural heritage site
 House of Kalajdžieski family - a cultural heritage site
 House of Gogoski family - a cultural heritage site
 House of Daskaloski family - a cultural heritage site
 House of Poposki family - a cultural heritage site

References

External links 

Houses in Vevčani
Cultural heritage of North Macedonia
Houses completed in 1890